The third election to the Llandeilo Rural District Council was held in March 1901. It was preceded by the 1898 election and followed by the 1904 election. The successful candidates were also elected to the Llandeilo Board of Guardians.

There were a number of unopposed returns in the rural parishes. In the industrial areas where the population was rapidly growing due to the anthracite coal industry most wards were contested.

Boundary changes
Following the growth of the population in the parishes of Betws and Llandybie, boundaries were re-arranged and additional seats created. A notable casualty of this change was Henry Herbert, Chair of the Llandeilo Board of Guardians, who was defeated in the Llandybie Ward by two other sitting members.

Ward Results

Bettws (one seat)

Bettws, Upper Ward (two seats)

Brechfa (one seat)

Glynamman (one seat)

Llandebie No.1 Ward (two seats)

Llandebie No.2, Ammanford (two seats)

Llandebie No.3, Blaenau (two seats)

Llandeilo Fawr North Ward (three seats)

Llandeilo Fawr South Ward (two seats)

Llandyfeisant (one seat)

Llanegwad (three seats)

Llanfihangel Aberbythych (two seats)

Llanfihangel Cilfragen (one seat)

Llangathen (two seats)

Llansawel (two seats)

Quarter Bach No.1 (one seat)

Quarter Bach No.2 (one seat)

Talley (two seats)

References

Elections in Carmarthenshire
1901 Welsh local elections
December 1901 events
20th century in Carmarthenshire